Vital or Vitals may refer to:

Places
 Vital Creek, a creek located in the Omineca Country region of British Columbia
 Vital Range, a subrange in the Omineca Mountains in British Columbia

People
Vital (given name)
Vital (surname)

Arts, entertainment, and media

Music
 Vital (Anberlin album), 2012
 Vital (Fernando Otero album), a 2010 album by Fernando Otero
 Vital (Van der Graaf Generator album), 1978
 Vital, a 2009 studio album by Norman Bedard
 Vitals (Mutemath album), 2015

Other uses in arts, entertainment, and media
 Vital (film), a 2004 Japanese movie directed by Shinya Tsukamoto
 Vitals (novel), a 2002 science fiction/techno-thriller novel by Greg Bear

Other uses
 Vital (grape), a Portuguese wine grape grown in the Alcobaça wine region
 USS Vital, two US warships
 Vital currents, the concept of currents within the body found in Yoga
 VITAL for Children, a charitable organisation 
 Vital Forsikring, a Norwegian insurance company
 Vital organs, that are essential to an individual's life
 Vital stain, a stain that can be applied on living cells without killing them
 Vitalism, the doctrine that life cannot be explained solely by mechanism
 Vitalism (Jainism), the Jain teacher Mahāvīra's philosophy
 Vitality, life, life force, health, youth, or ability to live or exist
 Vital, a software synthesizer VST created by Matt Tytel

See also
 Elan Vital (disambiguation)
 Saint Vital (disambiguation)
 Saint Vitalis (disambiguation)
 Vital signs (disambiguation)